Cupriavidus metallidurans is a non-spore-forming, Gram-negative bacterium which is adapted to survive several forms of heavy metal stress.

As a model and industrial system 

It is an ideal subject to study heavy metal disturbance of cellular processes. This bacterium shows a unique combination of advantages not present in this form in other bacteria.
 Its genome (strain CH34) has been fully sequenced (preliminary, annotated sequence data were obtained from the DOE Joint Genome Institute)
 It is not pathogenic, therefore, models of the cell can also be tested in artificial environments similar to its natural habitats.
 It is related to the plant pathogen Ralstonia solanacearum.
  It is of ecological importance since related bacteria are predominant in mesophilic heavy metal-contaminated environments.
 It is of industrial importance and used for heavy metal remediation and sensing.
 It is an aerobic chemolithoautotroph, facultatively able to grow in a mineral salts medium in the presence of H2, O2, and CO2 without an organic carbon source. The energy-providing subsystem of the cell under these conditions is composed only of the hydrogenase, the respiratory chain, and the F1F0-ATPase. This keeps this subsystem simple and clearly separated from the anabolic subsystems that starts with the Calvin cycle for CO2-fixation.
 It is able to degrade xenobiotics even in the presence of high heavy metal concentrations.
 Finally, strain CH34 is adapted to the outlined harsh conditions by a multitude of heavy-metal resistance systems that are encoded by the two indigenous megaplasmids pMOL28 and pMOL30 on the bacterial chromosome(s).

Ecology 
 
C. metallidurans plays a vital role, together with Delftia acidovorans, in the formation of gold nuggets. It precipitates metallic gold from a solution of gold(III) chloride, a compound highly toxic to most other microorganisms.

References

External links
Article at Live Science
Type strain of Cupriavidus metallidurans at BacDive - the Bacterial Diversity Metadatabase

Burkholderiaceae
Metallotolerants
Bacteria described in 2001